The Kaplan–Yorke map is a discrete-time dynamical system.   It is an example of a dynamical system that exhibits chaotic behavior.  The Kaplan–Yorke map takes a point (xn, yn ) in the plane and maps it to a new point given by

where mod is the modulo operator with real arguments. The map depends on only the one constant α.

Calculation method
Due to roundoff error, successive applications of the modulo operator will yield zero after some ten or twenty iterations when implemented as a floating point operation on a computer. It is better to implement the following equivalent algorithm:

Another way to avoid having the modulo operator yield zero after a short number of iterations is

which will still eventually return zero, albeit after many more iterations.

References
 
 

Chaotic maps